The Huntington Grange, also known as Old Baptist Church, in Wellington, Ohio, is a Greek Revival building built during 1842-46 as a Baptist church.  It is of wood-frame construction on a sandstone base.

It was listed on the National Register of Historic Places in 1979.

References

Clubhouses on the National Register of Historic Places in Ohio
Cultural infrastructure completed in 1842
Buildings and structures in Lorain County, Ohio
National Register of Historic Places in Lorain County, Ohio
Baptist churches in Ohio
1842 establishments in Ohio